Edmund Herbert (Hughie) McAlees (29 October 1879 – 20 December 1964) was an Australian politician who represented the South Australian House of Assembly seat of Wallaroo from 1950 to 1956 for the Labor Party.

References

1879 births
1964 deaths
Members of the South Australian House of Assembly
Australian Labor Party members of the Parliament of South Australia